Berkshiria is a genus of flies in the family Stratiomyidae.

Species
Berkshiria albistylum Johnson, 1914
Berkshiria hungarica (Kertesz, 1921)

References

Stratiomyidae
Brachycera genera
Taxa named by Charles Willison Johnson
Diptera of Europe
Diptera of North America